Bela, a Feia (Ugly Bela) is a Brazilian telenovela originally aired on Rede Record from August 4, 2009, to June 2, 2010. A co-production with Televisa, it was based on the Colombian telenovela Yo soy Betty, la fea, as well as the American series Ugly Betty.

On June 1, 2010, the penultimate episode of Bela, a Feia made Record lead the audience ratings against Rede Globo in both São Paulo and Rio de Janeiro, a feat rarely achieved in Brazilian television viewership.

Plot 
Bela is a competent and hardworking young woman who has a good academic background but cannot find a job because she looks ugly. In childhood Bela formed a humorous duo with Dinho, in which his ugliness was always the reason for the debauchery and jokes, being run by the boy's father, Ataufo. The two fled with the money they received from the shows and spent their lives scamming people and avoiding arrest with various disguises and identities. She lives in Gamboa, Rio de Janeiro, along with her father Clemente and siblings Max and Elvira - a hairdresser who works at her uncle Haroldo's salon. She lives in a comical war with her rival, Magdalena, who is also a local hairdresser and the two spend their days sabotaging to prove who is the best professional.

While Bela and Elvira are daughters of Clemente's late wife, Max is the son of an earlier romance with Samantha, a woman who lives in Copacabana and despises her son, being married to womanizer Armando and having daughter Ludmila, a girl who deems poverty a horror.

Bela gets a job at the + / Brazil advertising agency and becomes the secretary of the president, Rodrigo, falling in love with him as soon as she meets him, and receiving the contempt of other employees for her appearance. The publicist is the son of the owner of the company, Ricardo, and has great resentment for his mother, Vera, for believing he was abandoned by her when he was 4 years old. She, in fact, does not live abroad but is being held in private prison in a country house for 25 years by Ricardo, who threatens to reveal a grave secret from the past if she decides to return.

Rodrigo is engaged to the arrogant Cíntia, who mistreats the boy's housekeeper, Olga for covering up the boy's betrayals, unaware that the maid is his real mother. Rodrigo's biggest ordeal is the calculator Adriano, vice-president who dreams of one day taking over the leadership of + / Brazil and plans every step to topple him and show that the boy is incompetent, being there only for being the owner's son.

At the company, Diogo, who lives with Diego, a young man who does not understand his sexuality yet, has an affair with an older woman who supports him, although he is attracted to his flatmate. Diego is afraid to admit to himself that he is in love with another man, although Diogo has always made it clear that he is ready to have a relationship with him when he understands his sexuality.

The other secretary of the place, the cunning Veronica, does everything to stand out and has the alliance of Adriano and Cíntia to be able to rise within the company and get a prominent position. As time goes by Rodrigo gets closer and closer to Bela and falls in love with her, regardless of her appearance, but the romance is hindered by Veronica, who creates a trap to kill the girl at the request of Cíntia.

Although everyone believes that Bela really died, she is saved by Vera, who decides to transform her appearance so that she becomes a beautiful woman and returns, unrecognizable, to the company under the pseudonym Valentina, representing her actions directly in the presidency and taking revenge on those who despised her before revealing true identity.

Cast

Special participation

References

External links
Bela, a Feia - Official website (in Portuguese)

Yo soy Betty, la fea
2009 telenovelas
2009 Brazilian television series debuts
2010 Brazilian television series endings
Brazilian telenovelas
RecordTV telenovelas
Comedy telenovelas
Brazilian television series based on non-Brazilian television series
Portuguese-language telenovelas
Television shows set in Rio de Janeiro (city)